Rüstow is a German surname. Notable people with the surname include: 

 Alexander Rüstow (1885–1963), German sociologist and economist
 Alexander Rüstow (soldier), Prussian soldier and military writer
 Cäsar Rüstow, Prussian soldier and military writer
 Wilhelm Rüstow

German-language surnames